The Lockwood Aircraft Corporation is an ultralight aircraft manufacturer located in Sebring, Florida.

Leza-Lockwood was started by ultralight pioneer Phil Lockwood after the National Geographic Society asked him to design a camera plane to film in the Ndoki Rain Forest in the northern Congo Basin. Lockwood wanted a plane that would allow an engine failure in the jungle so he leaned towards a twin engine. The twin engine design required a huge vertical stabilizer which required a big-torsion resistant fuselage tail. The resulting concept was the Aircam.

Phil Lockwood sought funding from Antonio Leza to form the Leza-Lockwood Company with the intention of making the Aircam kit available to the public.  During the development only two engineers, Michael Schwartz and Pedro Gonzalez, worked for Leza-Lockwood.

In 2007, Lockwood Aircraft, a new company formed by Phil Lockwood, purchased all design rights, inventory and tooling from the prior owner Antonio Leza.

References

Aircraft
Lockwood Aircam
Lockwood Drifter

External links
 Manufacturers web page

Lockwood Aircraft Corporation
Companies based in Florida

de:Leza-Lockwood Aircam